LoveCat Music is an American independent record company and music publisher, founded in 1999 with a catalog of over 10,000 songs. It originally focused on indie rock — notably Evan Olson and Chris Von Sneidern. Since then the label has grown and diversified into releasing Latin (Cesar Mora, Latin Soul Syndicate, the Latin Moderns compilation series), ethnic lounge (Angel Tears, Zino & Tommy), jazz (Bill Anschell, Four Piece Suit) and eclectic records such as Lotus Lounge. Two of LoveCat's best-known artists are Reagan Youth and Los Straitjackets.

LoveCat Music is a publisher of Latin music, with writer-artists from Colombia, Mexico, Spain and Ecuador. Its roster includes such artists as Latin Soul Syndicate (USA), Los Niños de Sara (France), Cesar Mora (Colombia), La Palabra (Cuba-USA) and Damn (Sweden).

It also has large catalogs of Russian and French music.  Notable Russian writer-artists include Masha Shkonik (folk), Olga Alex (dance), Masha Pruss (rock) and the acclaimed Flying Balalaika Brothers (rock).  Its French music catalog features songs by 1960s ye-ye chanteuse Jacqueline Taïeb.  Current French artists include the rap duo La Caution and Parisian rockabilly singer Jesse Garon (musician).

In the R&B and hiphop fields, LoveCat Music works with Dojo Records, a New York-based management company. The roster includes writer-artists I.O.D. (Brooklyn), Connis (Boston), Rothstein (NYC), GoGo (Boston) and MisterrCha (London). The label's notable jazz artists include Bill Anschell, Mathias Landaeus, Four Piece Suit and Tobias Gebb.

Some artists are signed only to LoveCat's music publishing company (Los Niños de Sara, Madder Rose, Doug Kershaw, Mary Lorson & Saint Low, Seb Taylor aka Kaya Project, Nick Fowler, Athenaeum). Songs from the LoveCat catalog have been licensed in films and television shows including Deadpool, Beverly Hills Chihuahua, Soul Men, The Sopranos, Sex and The City, The Devil Wears Prada and SpongeBob SquarePants.

Artists 
Angel Tears
Bill Anschell
Nick Fowler
Evan Olson
Jacqueline Taïeb
Matt Keating
Khalil
Reagan Youth 
Daniel Lemma
Los Straitjackets
Misisipi Mike Wolf
Cree Rider
Mary Lorson & Saint Low
Sandy Mouche
Snuzz
Tracy Thornton
Pierce Turner
Chris Von Sneidern
Zee Asha
Zino & Tommy

See also
 List of record labels

External links
  Discogs
 Official web site
 Music Alive magazine article
 Music Connection magazine article

References

American independent record labels
Companies based in New York City
Alternative rock record labels
Electronic music record labels
Indie rock record labels
Latin American music record labels
Music publishing companies of the United States
Pop record labels
Record labels established in 1999
World music record labels
1999 establishments in New York (state)
New York (state) record labels